Syllipsimopodi is an extinct member of the cephalopod subclass Coleoidea belonging to the clade Vampyropoda, which includes octopuses (Octopoda) and vampire squids (Vampyromorphida). The type and only known species is Syllipsimopodi bideni, named in honor of US President Joe Biden, and to raise awareness of his climate change policies. The well-preserved holotype fossil was found in the Bear Gulch Limestone deposit in the US state of Montana in 1988, and donated that year to the Royal Ontario Museum by one B. Hawes, designated ROMIP 64897. The species lived during the (Carboniferous) mississippian 330.3 to 323.4 million years ago pushing back the group of cephalopods by 81.9 million years. The cephalopod was named after Joe Biden, who was president of the United States at the time of its discovery. Whalen and Landman said in an interview that this name was chosen because they were, “encouraged by his plans to address climate change and to fund scientific research”.

Description 
It is currently the oldest known vampyropod and the oldest known cephalopod with biserial suckers on its ten robust appendages. The lead author of S. bideni states that it is the only known vampyropod that has 10 functional appendages, with all other species having eight arms, suggesting that their ancestors had ten arms. The arms measure to about ~2.1 to 2.4 mm wide at the midlength. Two of the arms measure in at ~4.0 to 4.1 cm long making up 27% of the total body length. The elongated arms do not have obvious manus and are thinner than the other arms. The suckers are based along the midlength and are ~0.62 mm in diameter and are separated by ~0.5 mm. There is no evidence that the suckers were stalked. A possible funnel measuring ~2.4 mm long was preserved with a lateral edge of the head.

References

Octopodiformes
Prehistoric cephalopod genera
Mississippian cephalopods
Carboniferous cephalopods of North America
Fossils of the United States
Fossil taxa described in 2022